Florian Siwicki (10 January 1925 – 11 March 2013) was a Polish military officer, diplomat and communist politician. He was a general in the Polish Army and Minister of Defense of Poland from 1983 to 1990.

Military and political career

Son of Elżbieta and Eugeniusz. His father was a non-commissioned officer. In 1930, Eugeniusz Siwicki was transferred to the reserve and moved with his family to village near Rivne. At first, he was the owner of a small, three-hectare farm, and later he was employed as a bookkeeper in the commune office.

In April 1940, his father was arrested by NKVD officers. A month later, Florian and his mother were deported deep into the Soviet Union to the Arkhangelsk region. At the age of 17 he was forced to join the Red Army. From December 1942, he served in the 105 Independent Sapper Battalion, where he became the deputy commander of the platoon. In May 1943 he was in the ranks of the Polish Armed Forces in the USSR. He served in the 1st Tadeusz Kościuszko Infantry Division.

In early 1945, after 5 months of officer training in the Soviet Union, he was commissioned a lieutenant in the Soviet-allied Polish People's Army. He commanded infantry platoons and companies in the East Pomeranian Offensive and the Prague Offensive.

After the war, he continued his military career as an infantry officer and political career as a member and official of the Polish Workers' Party (PPR). In the army he became a "political officer"; he advanced also in the PPR and then the Polish United Workers' Party (PZPR). He was not very close to the Stalinist wing of the party, although dutifully carried out their orders. From 1951 to 1953 he underwent a Command-and-Staff course for Brigade and Division Command at the M. V. Frunze Military Academy in the Soviet Union. Siwicki was later promoted to lieutenant-colonel and commanded an infantry battalion in the Warsaw Military District until 1957. He was promoted to colonel in 1957 and brigadier in 1960. From 1956 to 1959 he was in charge of the Military Intelligence and Police division in the Warsaw Military District. In the course of his career he held a number of senior posts, including military attaché in China from 1959 to 1961, commander of an independent mechanized brigade in the Silesian Military District from 1961 to 1963, commanding officer of the 8th Motorised/Mechanized Infantry Division from 1963 to 1967, commander of the 2nd Polish Army from 1967 to 1972 (including during the Warsaw Pact invasion of Czechoslovakia in 1968), commander of the Silesian Military District from 1972 to 1973 and  Chief of General Staff of the Polish Army from 1973 to 1983. Siwicki was a long-serving Minister of National Defense in the governments of Wojciech Jaruzelski, Zbigniew Messner, Mieczysław Rakowski and Tadeusz Mazowiecki (from 1983 to 1990 total). In 1972 he became a candidate member of the Politburo of the PZPR, and in 1980 a full member. Siwicki was appointed to the position of Minister of Defense after Jaruzelski stepped down from that post; he also functioned as Jaruzelski's "top deputy on the defense council". In October 1983, Siwicki was awarded with the Order of the Cross of Grunwald, first class, one of his many decorations.

As agreed in the Round Table talks and during subsequent political developments, Siwicki remained the Minister of Defense in Solidarity-led government of Mazowiecki until July 1990.

References

1925 births
2013 deaths
People from Lutsk
People from Wołyń Voivodeship (1921–1939)
Polish Workers' Party politicians
Members of the Politburo of the Polish United Workers' Party
Ministers of National Defence of Poland
Members of the Polish Sejm 1976–1980
Members of the Polish Sejm 1980–1985
Members of the Polish Sejm 1985–1989
Diplomats of the Polish People's Republic
Polish military attachés
Polish People's Army generals
Soviet military personnel of World War II
Polish military personnel of World War II
Military Academy of the General Staff of the Armed Forces of the Soviet Union alumni
Frunze Military Academy alumni
Recipients of the Order of the Builders of People's Poland
Recipients of the Order of the Banner of Work